Yema is a sweet custard confectionery from the Philippines. It is made with egg yolks, milk, and sugar. The name yema is from Spanish for "egg yolk". Like other egg yolk-based Filipino desserts, it is believed that yema originated from early Spanish construction materials. During the Spanish colonization of the Philippines, egg whites mixed with quicklime and eggshells were used as a type of mortar to hold stone walls together. Filipinos reused the discarded egg yolks into various dishes. Among them is yema, which is possibly based on the Spanish pastry Yemas de Santa Teresa.

Yemas were originally made with only egg yolks and sugar, heated and stirred until the consistency is thick. They are then shaped into small balls or pyramids and covered in white sugar. Milk (or condensed milk) later became part of the recipe (probably during the American period). Modern variations also usually include chopped nuts.

See also
 Yema cake
 Pastel de Camiguín
 Pastillas
 Leche flan

References

Philippine desserts